Malard (also Romanized as Malārd) is a village in Khoshkrud Rural District, in the Central District of Zarandieh County, Markazi Province, Iran. At the 2006 census, its population was 95, in 22 families.

References 

Populated places in Zarandieh County